David Weller (born 11 February 1957) is a retired Jamaican track cyclist.

Weller won a bronze medal in 1000 metres time trial at the 1980 Summer Olympics in Moscow, becoming the first (and still the only) Jamaican to win an Olympic medal in another sport than athletics.

At the next Olympic Games in Los Angeles 1984, Weller finished sixth as a result of a serious pre-Olympic competition injury received in a crash in Medellin, Colombia two months before his 1984 Olympic competition.

References

External links
 
 
 1000m Time Trial at Full Olympians

1957 births
Living people
Jamaican male cyclists
Cyclists at the 1976 Summer Olympics
Cyclists at the 1980 Summer Olympics
Cyclists at the 1984 Summer Olympics
Olympic cyclists of Jamaica
Olympic bronze medalists for Jamaica
Olympic medalists in cycling
Medalists at the 1980 Summer Olympics
Cyclists at the 1978 Commonwealth Games
Cyclists at the 1982 Commonwealth Games
Commonwealth Games bronze medallists for Jamaica
Cyclists at the 1983 Pan American Games
Pan American Games silver medalists for Jamaica
Pan American Games bronze medalists for Jamaica
Commonwealth Games medallists in cycling
Pan American Games medalists in cycling
Cyclists at the 1979 Pan American Games
Medalists at the 1979 Pan American Games
Medalists at the 1983 Pan American Games
Medallists at the 1978 Commonwealth Games